John Powys, 5th Baron Lilford (12 January 1863 – 17 December 1945), was a British peer and cricketer.

Biography

Powys was born at Lilford Hall, Northamptonshire, the son of ornithologist Thomas Powys, 4th Baron Lilford, and his wife Emma Elizabeth Powys (née Brandling).

He inherited the title of Baron Lilford in 1896 upon the death of his father, along with the Lilford Hall, Bank Hall and Bewsey estates.

Powys was educated at Harrow School, and graduated from Brasenose College, Oxford in 1886.

He was an officer in the 3rd (Militia) Battalion of the Sherwood Foresters (Derbyshire Regiment) until he resigned with the honorary rank of Major on 4 June 1902. On 29 July 1922, he was appointed a deputy lieutenant of Northamptonshire.

Powys played cricket for Northamptonshire in 1911, making a single first-class appearance against the touring India national cricket team at the County Ground, Northampton.

Family
He married Milly Isabella Louisa Soltau-Symons, a daughter of George William Culme Soltau Symons of Chaddlewood, the marriage took place on the 9th of August 1894 at Plympton St Mary, Devon. The Lilfords used the Bank Hall estate as a holiday home until 1898.  Lady Lilford died on 8 April 1940 at Oundle. He died in Kettering on 17 December 1945 and was buried on 21 December 1945 at St Peters Church, Lilford cum Wigsthorpe, Northamptonshire. Their only child Thomas Atherton Powys (8 May 1896 – 3 August 1909) died aged 13 during an operation for adenoids.

The estates and title of Lord Lilford passed to Stephen Powys, who was the godson of Thomas Powys, 4th Baron Lilford, and adoptive brother of John Powys, 5th Baron Lilford.

References

1863 births
1945 deaths
John
Deputy Lieutenants of Northamptonshire
English cricketers
Northamptonshire cricketers
British Militia officers